The 2019–20 Biathlon World Cup – Stage 7 was the seventh event of the season and is held in Nové Město, Czech Republic, from 5 to 8 March 2020.

Schedule of events 
The events took place at the following times.

Medal winners

Men

Women

References 

Biathlon World Cup - Stage 7, 2019-20
2019–20 Biathlon World Cup
Biathlon competitions in the Czech Republic
Biathlon World Cup